The MIT Computation Center was organized in 1956 as a 10-year joint venture between the Massachusetts Institute of Technology and IBM to provide computing resources for New England universities. As part of the venture, IBM installed an IBM 704, which remained at MIT until 1960.

Operation Moonwatch

After the successful launch of Sputnik on October 4, 1957, the race was on to calculate and predict where the first man-made satellites would appear in the sky. Fred Lawrence Whipple, then director of the Smithsonian Astrophysical Observatory (SAO) in Cambridge Massachusetts, had gathered amateur astronomers to track artificial satellites in an organization called Operation Moonwatch. The aim was to get the position of the satellite in order to obtain its orbital elements. The first "satisfactory orbit" calculated by the IBM 704 as official tracker for the SAO occurred at 7AM on October 11, 1957.

References 

 Christian Science Monitor, "Soviet Space-Satellite Rocket Sighted By Observation Teams in Cambridge", Oct 11, 1957, page 1
 Tech Talk (MIT Newsletter), October 22, 1957 "A Lucky Seven"   
 Tech Engineering News, "moon track", March 1958, Vol XXXIX No. 6, p68
 Beyer, Jean-David and Sidney Shinedling, "The i.b.m 704 computer at m.i.t" tech engineering news, May 1958, Vol XXXIX No. 8, p26
 NASA Article Citation "Technical aspects of satellite tracking on IBM computers at Smithsonian Astrophysical Observatory in Cambridge, Massachusetts" Feb 26, 1960

External links

 Archive.org: selected articles and references on Sputnik

Computation Center
Computer science institutes in the United States
Research institutes in Massachusetts
1956 in computing
Research institutes established in 1956
Scientific organizations established in 1956
1956 establishments in Massachusetts